Dewhurst is a bounded locality in Victoria, Australia, 48 km south-east of Melbourne's Central Business District, located within the Shire of Cardinia local government area. Dewhurst recorded a population of 151 at the 2021 census.

Nearby attractions
It contains part of Cardinia Reservoir. Nearby attractions include Dandenong Ranges, Cardinia Reservoir and Emerald Lake Park. Mount Dandenong is clearly visible from Dewhurst. It has many forests surrounding it and also many picnic areas.

Today
It has a general store and no other stores.

See also
 Shire of Pakenham – Dewhurst was previously within this former local government area.

References

Shire of Cardinia